The (second) Battle of Mantinea or Mantineia was fought on 4 July 362 BC between the Thebans, led by Epaminondas and supported by the Arcadians and the Boeotian league against the Spartans, led by King Agesilaus II and supported by the Eleans, Athenians,  and Mantineans. The battle was to determine which of the two alliances would dominate Greece.  However, the death of Epaminondas and his intended successors coupled with the impact on the Spartans of yet another defeat weakened both alliances, and paved the way for Macedonian conquest led by Philip II of Macedon.

Background 

After the Battle of Leuctra in 371 BC had shattered the foundations of Spartan hegemony, Thebes' chief politician and general Epaminondas attempted to build a new hegemony centered on his city. Consequently, the Thebans had marched south, into the area traditionally dominated by the Spartans, and set up the Arcadian League, a federation of city-states of the central Peloponnesian plateau, to contain Spartan influence in the Peloponnese and thereby maintain overall Theban control. In years prior to the Battle of Mantinea, the Spartans had joined with the Eleans (a minor Peloponnesian people with a territorial grudge against the Arcadians) in an effort to undermine the League.  When the Arcadians miscalculated and seized the Pan-Hellenic sanctuary of Zeus at Olympia in Elis, one of the Arcadian city-states, Mantinea, detached itself from the League.  The Spartans and Eleans joined the Mantineans in a military attack on the Arcadian League. Athens decided to support the Spartans, as she resented the growing Theban power. The Athenians also recalled that at the end of Peloponnesian War, the Thebans had demanded that Athens be destroyed and its inhabitants enslaved; the Spartans had resisted these demands. An Athenian army was sent by sea to join the Spartan-led forces, in order to avoid being intercepted on land by Theban forces. Epaminondas then led a Theban army into the Peloponnese to restore order and re-establish Theban/Arcadian hegemony there.

Battle 
The two armies met near Mantinea in 362 BC. The Spartans, Athenians, Eleans and Mantineans were led by the Spartan king, Agesilaus II, who was assisted by Podares of Mantinea and Cephisodorus of Marathon, the commander of the Athenian cavalry. The Theban army also included contingents from city-states of the pro-Theban Boeotian League. Epaminondas' Thebans were assisted by the Arcadians loyal to the League, principally those from the city-states of Megalopolis (founded by the Thebans when they were last in the Peloponnese, as the Arcadian federal capital) and Tegea (the traditional leading city-state of the Arcadians). Though both generals were highly competent, Epaminondas prevailed at Mantinea. Using a modified version of the tactics he had successfully pioneered at Leuctra, he organised the Boeotian troops on the left wing of his army into an unusually deep column of hoplites. This formation of troops, in conjunction with the echelon, sought to establish local superiority of numbers while delaying the battle on the weaker center and right side. This tactic allowed the large, dense section of the line to force its way through the thinner classical phalanx. Epaminondas personally led this column from the front line. Xenophon (Hellenika 7.5.23) described the left wing of that Theban army as "like a trireme, with the spur of the prow out in front."

The Theban cavalry and light infantry drove off the enemy cavalry. The Theban hoplites marched in a column across the face of the enemy line, then performed a smart wheel and crashed into the enemy right, where the Mantineans were positioned. The Mantinean leader Podares offered heroic resistance, but when he was killed the Mantinean hoplites fled the field. However, in the thick of the fighting, Epaminondas was mortally wounded when facing the Spartan phalanx by a man variously identified as Anticrates, Machaerion, or Gryllus, son of Xenophon. The Theban leaders Iolaidas and Daiphantus, whom he intended to succeed him, were also killed.

According to Polyaenus after the battle the Mantineians wanted to send heralds to the Thebans, in order to make an agreement about carrying off the dead. But Cineas persuade them against such an action.

Aftermath
On his deathbed, Epaminondas, upon hearing of the deaths of his fellow leaders, instructed the Thebans to make peace, despite having won the battle.  Without his leadership, Theban hopes for hegemony faded. The Spartans, however, having again been defeated in battle, were unable to replace their losses.  The ultimate result of the battle was to pave the way for the Macedonian rise as the leading force who subjugated the rest of Greece, by exploiting the weakness of both the Thebans and the Spartans.

Footnotes

References

External links 
 Hellenika 7.5.23 on Perseus Xenophon

362 BC
Mantinea (362 BC)
Mantinea 362 BC
Mantinea 362 BC
Mantinea 362 BC
Late Classical Greece
Theban hegemony
Ancient Arcadia